Joshua Tuaniga (born March 18, 1997) is an American professional volleyball player. He is a member of the US national team. Tuaniga competed for the American youth teams in the 2015 U19 World Championship and the 2017 U21 World Championship. At the professional club level, he plays for Indykpol AZS Olsztyn.

Honours

College
 National championships
 2018  NCAA national championship, with Long Beach State Beach
 2019  NCAA national championship, with Long Beach State Beach

Youth national team
 2014  NORCECA U19 Championship
 2016  NORCECA U21 Championship

Individual awards
 2016: NORCECA U21 Championship – Most Valuable Player
 2016: NORCECA U21 Championship – Best Setter 
 2016: AVCA Second-Team All-American
 2017: AVCA First-Team All-American
 2018: All-Big West First-Team
 2018: AVCA First-Team All-American
 2018: AVCA National Player of the Year
 2018: NCAA National Championship – All Tournament Team (Most Outstanding Player)
 2019: All-Big West First-Team
 2019: AVCA First-Team All-American
 2019: NCAA National Championship – All Tournament Team

References

External links
 Player profile at TeamUSA.org
 Player profile at PlusLiga.pl 
 Player profile at Volleybox.net
 Long Beach State Beach 2019 roster – Joshua Tuaniga

1997 births
Living people
Volleyball players from Long Beach, California
American men's volleyball players
American expatriate sportspeople in Poland
Expatriate volleyball players in Poland
Long Beach State Beach men's volleyball players
Ślepsk Suwałki players
AZS Olsztyn players
Setters (volleyball)